McKinley Senior High School, located in Baton Rouge, Louisiana, United States on 800 E. McKinley St., is home to the East Baton Rouge Parish School Board's first  gifted and talented high school programs. The school mascot is a Panther and the school colors are royal blue and white.

History 

The original 1926 McKinley High School building, now being used by Alumni Association as the McKinley High School Alumni Center, was listed on the National Register of Historic Places on November 16, 1981.

The forerunner of McKinley Senior High, was named the Hickory Street School, which was located several blocks East of the present site, in 1907–1908. The school outgrew the building, so the school was renamed The Baton Rouge Colored High School and moved to a new location.

The Baton Rouge Colored High School was located at the corner of Perkins Road and Bynum Street in 1913. This facility was later struck by lightning and destroyed.

McKinley was the first high school established for African Americans in East Baton Rouge Parish. McKinley's first graduating class was in 1916. The four students became the first African American high school graduates in Louisiana.

The original McKinley High School building was constructed in 1926 and opened in 1927, and was named in honor of the 25th President of the United States. The school opened September 19, 1927 on Texas Street, currently named Thomas H. Delpit Drive.

In 1950 the High School was moved to a new facility at the corner of Louise Street and McCalop Street, next to the present day I-10. The Thomas H. Delpit Drive facility became McKinley Junior High School.

In 1962, the third and present day McKinley Senior High School was built on East McKinley Street, the Junior High School was moved to the I-10 site, and the Thomas H. Delpit Drive site became McKinley Elementary.

The original McKinley Senior High School facility on Thomas H. Delpit Dr. was entered into the National Register of Historic Places on November 16, 1981, and was subsequently purchased by the Alumni Association from the East Baton Rouge Parish School Board on February 5, 1992.

On January 14, 2016, President Barack Obama hosted a town hall at Mckinley High.  This was the first time a sitting president hosted a town hall at a secondary school in Louisiana.

Campus
The current campus sits in Old South Baton Rouge just to the northwest of the Louisiana State University campus, and is bordered by Lake Crest, one of the LSU lakes to the East.  Facilities include five main buildings, many out buildings, football and baseball fields, tennis courts, track and field facilities, and a new black box theater which was built by students in 2006.

Communities served
McKinley serves sections of Baton Rouge and half of the Gardere census-designated place.

Academics
McKinley offers 23 Advanced Placement courses, and is one of Baton Rouge's two high schools with a Gifted and Talented program.

As of 2007 McKinley's high academics standards, it ranked among the best in the state.  The students ranked 18th of all schools in Louisiana for the statewide average ACT score and 3rd in the state when comparing their Gifted and Talented program.

Athletics 

McKinley competes in the Louisiana High School Athletic Association (LHSAA) District 5 Class 5A.  Their biggest rival is Scotlandville Magnet High School.

They compete in the following sports:

 Football
 Volleyball
 Boys and Girls Basketball
 Boys and Girls Soccer
 Tennis
 Golf
 Track and Cross Country
 Baseball
 Softball
 Bowling
 Wrestling
 Swimming

Athletic history 
On 17 April 2018 the LHSAA fined the school $2,500 and placed all its athletic programs on probation for two calendar years after sanctions related to multiple sports during the 2017–18 year. Four coaches had their Louisiana High School Coaches Association card privileges revoked for one year. The four programs involved were the girls junior varsity basketball, girls soccer, boys track and volleyball programs. After further investigation found more than 150 eligibility and rules compliance infractions the fine was increased to nearly $42,000, the entire 2017–2018 coaching staff (both faculty and non-faculty) was banned from coaching at any LHSAA school for one year, the school was given a two-year playoff ban for all sports, and the school forfeited runner-up finishes in Division I girls basketball for 2017 and 2018.

Championships
Football championships
(5) State Championships: 1926, 1927, 1929, 1942, 1954

Notable alumni
Donnie Ray Albert – Grammy Award-winning opera performer (Porgy and Bess)
Jason Banks – Pro football player for the Arizona Cardinals
Pepper Bassett – Major league baseball catcher with the Birmingham Black Barons.
Hubert 'Rap' Brown –  Radical leader of the 1960s - author of Die Nigger Die!.  Attended McKinley.
Isiah Carey- Emmy award-winning television journalist with KRIV Houston
Don Chaney - Former NBA great (Boston Celtics) and former head coach of New York Knicks, Houston Rockets, and Detroit Pistons.
Cleo Fields - Louisiana State Senator and former United States Congressman
Kevin Gates - rapper; owns Bread Winner Association (BWA); attended McKinley
Tommie Green - former NBA player and former collegiate head basketball coach (Southern University)
John Michael Guidry - Louisiana appellate court judge from Baton Rouge
Buddy Guy – Five-time Grammy Award-winning blues guitarist whom Eric Clapton and many music critics have called the greatest blues guitarist alive.
Edward C. James - state representative for District 101 in East Baton Rouge Parish since 2012
Chris Thomas King – Grammy Award-winning blues artist and actor (O Brother Where Art Thou?)
Chenese Lewis – actress & plus-size model
Lil Boosie – rapper. Attended McKinley.
Jerome Meyinsse (born 1988) – basketball player in the Israeli Basketball Premier League. Played college at University of Virginia.
Jewel Joseph Newman (Class of 1941), black city council member from Baton Rouge, 1972 to 1984; member of the Louisiana House of Representatives, 1984 to 1988; community organizer
Calvin Nicholas - former wide receiver for San Francisco 49ers
Judge Freddie Pitcher, Jr. - first African American elected to Baton Rouge City Court, first African American male elected to the Nineteenth Judicial District Court (1987) and first African American elected to the Louisiana First Circuit Court of Appeal and former Chancellor of the Southern University Law Center.
Eddie G. Robinson – Hall of Fame former Grambling State University football coach
Keith Smart - former Indiana basketball player, one-time head coach of Cleveland Cavaliers, Golden State Warriors, and Sacramento Kings. Current Assistant Coach of the NBA's Memphis Grizzlies.
Gardner C. Taylor — Pastor Emeritus of Concord Baptist Church in Brooklyn, NY. Theologian, scholar, and teacher (Harvard and Yale), recipient of Presidential Medal of Freedom. Named America's Greatest Black Preacher (Ebony Magazine Poll, 1993)
Tyrus Thomas - former LSU basketball player, now playing for the Charlotte Bobcats
Lynn Whitfield – actress and producer
Nemiah Wilson — former All-pro defensive back and kick returner with Denver Broncos and Oakland Raiders 1965-75
Herb Williams – former NFL defensive back for the San Francisco 49ers and the St. Louis Cardinals
Joe Williams – American football player

See also
National Register of Historic Places listings in East Baton Rouge Parish, Louisiana

References

External links
  McKinley High School

Schools in Baton Rouge, Louisiana
Public high schools in Louisiana
Magnet schools in Louisiana
School buildings on the National Register of Historic Places in Louisiana
National Register of Historic Places in Baton Rouge, Louisiana
1907 establishments in Louisiana
Educational institutions established in 1907